Nantyderry railway station was a former station which served the Monmouthshire village of Nant-y-derry.  It was located on the Welsh Marches Line between Pontypool and Abergavenny.

History 
The station opened on 2 January 1854 by the Newport, Abergavenny and Hereford Railway. It was known as Nantyderry or Goitre in Bradshaw until it was changed in April 1859. It was omitted from Bradshaw from May 1859 until November 1859.

The station closed in 1958. The double line remains in use.

The adjacent Foxhunter Inn was originally the tea-room for the station.

Accidents 
An accident occurred to the north of the station on 12 November 1856, killing 2 passengers. A southbound passenger train came off the line, due to a broken spring on the locomotive. As people were escaping, the wreckage was hit by a northbound goods train that could not stop in time.

References

Further reading

Disused railway stations in Monmouthshire
Former Great Western Railway stations
Railway stations in Great Britain closed in 1854
Railway stations in Great Britain closed in 1958